Transcendental Étude may refer to:

 Transcendental Études (1852), S.139, 12 studies for piano by Franz Liszt
 12 Transcendental Études (Lyapunov), 12 Études d'exécution transcendante (1897–1905), Op. 11, for piano by Sergei Lyapunov
 Transcendental Studies (Sorabji) (1940–44), 100 studies for piano by Kaikhosru Shapurji Sorabji
 Etudes Transcendantales (1982–85), song cycle for mezzo-soprano and chamber ensemble by Brian Ferneyhough
 Studio Trascendentale, Op. 102, by Adolfo Fumagalli

See also
 Études (disambiguation)
 Étude, the musical form
 Étude (instrumental)